Structural biology is a field that is many centuries old which, as defined by the Journal of Structural Biology, deals with structural analysis of living material (formed, composed of, and/or maintained and refined by living cells) at every level of organization. Early structural biologists throughout the 19th and early 20th centuries were primarily only able to study structures to the limit of the naked eye's visual acuity and through magnifying glasses and light microscopes.

In the 20th century, a variety of experimental techniques were developed to examine the 3D structures of biological molecules. The most prominent techniques are X-ray crystallography, nuclear magnetic resonance, and electron microscopy. Through the discovery of X-rays and its applications to protein crystals, structural biology was revolutionized, as now scientists could obtain the three-dimensional structures of biological molecules in atomic detail. Likewise, NMR spectroscopy allowed information about protein structure and dynamics to be obtained. Finally, in the 21st century, electron microscopy also saw a drastic revolution with the development of more coherent electron sources, aberration correction for electron microscopes, and reconstruction software that enabled the successful implementation of high resolution cryo-electron microscopy, thereby permitting the study of individual proteins and molecular complexes in three-dimensions at angstrom resolution.

With the development of these three techniques, the field of structural biology expanded and also became a branch of molecular biology, biochemistry, and biophysics concerned with the molecular structure of biological macromolecules (especially proteins, made up of amino acids, RNA or DNA, made up of nucleotides, and membranes, made up of lipids), how they acquire the structures they have, and how alterations in their structures affect their function. This subject is of great interest to biologists because macromolecules carry out most of the functions of cells, and it is only by coiling into specific three-dimensional shapes that they are able to perform these functions. This architecture, the "tertiary structure" of molecules, depends in a complicated way on each molecule's basic composition, or "primary structure." At lower resolutions, tools such as FIB-SEM tomography have allowed for greater understanding of cells and their organelles in 3-dimensions, and how each hierarchical level of various extracellular matrices contributes to function (for example in bone). In the past few years it has also become possible to predict highly accurate physical molecular models to complement the experimental study of biological structures. Computational techniques such as Molecular Dynamics simulations can be used in conjunction with empirical structure determination strategies to extend and study protein structure, conformation and function.

History 
In 1912 Max Von Laue directed X-Rays at crystallized copper sulfate generating a diffraction pattern. These experiments led to the development of X-Ray Crystallography, and its usage in exploring biological structures. In 1951, Rosalind Franklin and Maurice Wilkins used X-ray diffraction patterns to capture the first image of deoxyribonucleic acid (DNA). Francis Crick and James Watson modeled the double helical structure of DNA using this same technique in 1953 and received the Nobel Prize in Medicine along with Wilkins in 1962.

Pepsin crystals were the first proteins to be crystallized for use in X-Ray diffraction, by Theodore Svedberg who received the 1962 Nobel Prize in Chemistry. The first tertiary protein structure, that of Myoglobin, was published in 1958 by John Kendrew. During this time, modeling of protein structures was done using balsa wood or wire models. With the invention of modeling software such as CCP4 in the late 1970s, modeling is now done with computer assistance. Recent developments in the field have included the generation of X-ray free electron lasers, allowing analysis of the dynamics and motion of biological molecules, and the use of structural biology in assisting synthetic biology.

In the late 1930s and early 1940s, the combination of work done by Isidor Rabi, Felix Bloch, and Edward Mills Purcell led to the development of nuclear magnetic resonance (NMR). Currently, solid-state NMR is widely used in the field of structural biology to determine the structure and dynamic nature of proteins (protein NMR).

In 1990, Richard Henderson produced the first three-dimensional, high resolution image of bacteriorhodopsin using cryogenic electron microscopy (cryo-EM). Since then, cryo-EM has emerged as an increasingly popular technique to determine three-dimensional, high resolution structures of biological images.

More recently, computational methods have been developed to model and study biological structures. For example, molecular dynamics (MD) is commonly used to analyze the dynamic movements of biological molecules. In 1975, the first simulation of a biological folding process using MD was published in Nature. Recently, protein structure prediction was significantly improved by a new machine learning method called AlphaFold. Some claim that computational approaches are starting to lead the field of structural biology research.

Techniques 
Biomolecules are too small to see in detail even with the most advanced light microscopes. The methods that structural biologists use to determine their structures generally involve measurements on vast numbers of identical molecules at the same time. These methods include:
 Mass spectrometry
 Macromolecular crystallography
 Neutron diffraction
 Proteolysis
 Nuclear magnetic resonance spectroscopy of proteins (NMR)
 Electron paramagnetic resonance (EPR)
 Cryogenic Electron Microscopy (cryoEM)
 Electron crystallography and Microcrystal electron diffraction
 Multiangle light scattering
 Small angle scattering
 Ultrafast laser spectroscopy
 Anisotropic terahertz microspectroscopy
 Two-dimensional infrared spectroscopy
 Dual-polarization interferometry and circular dichroism
Most often researchers use them to study the "native states" of macromolecules. But variations on these methods are also used to watch nascent or denatured molecules assume or reassume their native states. See protein folding.

A third approach that structural biologists take to understanding structure is bioinformatics to look for patterns among the diverse sequences that give rise to particular shapes. Researchers often can deduce aspects of the structure of integral membrane proteins based on the membrane topology predicted by hydrophobicity analysis. See protein structure prediction.

Applications 

Structural biologists have made significant contributions towards understanding the molecular components and mechanisms underlying human diseases. For example, cryo-EM and ssNMR have been used to study the aggregation of amyloid fibrils, which are associated with Alzheimer's disease, Parkinson's disease, and type II diabetes. In addition to amyloid proteins, scientists have used cryo-EM to produce high resolution models of tau filaments in the brain of Alzheimer's patients which may help develop better treatments in the future. Structural biology tools can also be used to explain interactions between pathogens and hosts. For example, structural biology tools have enabled virologists to understand how the HIV envelope allows the virus to evade human immune responses.

Structural biology is also an important component of drug discovery. Scientists can identify targets using genomics, study those targets using structural biology, and develop drugs that are suited for those targets. Specifically, ligand-NMR, mass spectrometry, and X-ray crystallography are commonly used techniques in the drug discovery process. For example, researchers have used structural biology to better understand Met, which is an important drug target for cancer. Similar research has been conducted for HIV targets to treat people with AIDS. Researchers are also developing new antimicrobials for mycobacterial infections using structure-driven drug discovery.

See also 

 Primary structure
 Secondary structure
 Tertiary structure
 Quaternary structure
 Structural domain
 Structural motif
 Protein subunit
 Molecular model
 Cooperativity
 Chaperonin
 Structural genomics
 Stereochemistry
 Resolution (electron density)
 Proteopedia The collaborative, 3D encyclopedia of proteins and other molecules.
 Protein structure prediction

References

External links 

 
 Nature: Structural & Molecular Biology magazine website
 Journal of Structural Biology
 Structural Biology - The Virtual Library of Biochemistry, Molecular Biology and Cell Biology
 Structural Biology in Europe

 
Molecular biology
Protein structure
Biophysics